Trifunctional enzyme subunit alpha, mitochondrial also known as hydroxyacyl-CoA dehydrogenase/3-ketoacyl-CoA thiolase/enoyl-CoA hydratase (trifunctional protein), alpha subunit is a protein that in humans is encoded by the HADHA gene. Mutations in HADHA have been associated with trifunctional protein deficiency or long-chain 3-hydroxyacyl-coenzyme A dehydrogenase deficiency.

Structure

HADHA is an 82.9 kDa protein composed of 763 amino acids.

The mitochondrial membrane-bound heterocomplex is composed of four alpha and four beta subunits, with the alpha subunit catalyzing the 3-hydroxyacyl-CoA dehydrogenase and enoyl-CoA hydratase activities. The genes of the alpha and beta subunits of the mitochondrial trifunctional protein are located adjacent to each other in the human genome in a head-to-head orientation.

Function 

This gene encodes the alpha subunit of the mitochondrial trifunctional protein, which catalyzes the last three steps of mitochondrial beta-oxidation of long chain fatty acids. The enzyme converts medium- and long-chain 2-enoyl-CoA compounds into the following 3-ketoacyl-CoA when NAD is solely present, and acetyl-CoA when NAD and CoASH are present. The alpha subunit catalyzes this reaction, and is attached to HADHB, which catalyzes the last step of the reaction.

Clinical significance 

Mutations in this gene result in trifunctional protein deficiency or long-chain 3-hydroxyacyl-coenzyme A dehydrogenase deficiency.

The most common form of the mutation is G1528C, in which the guanine at the 1528th position is changed to a cytosine. The gene mutation creates a protein deficiency that is associated with impaired oxidation of long-chain fatty acids that can lead to sudden infant death. Clinical manifestations of this deficiency can include myopathy, cardiomyopathy, episodes of coma, and hypoglycemia. Long-chain L-3-hydroxyacyl-coenzyme A dehydrogenase deficiency is associated with some pregnancy-specific disorders, including preeclampsia, HELLP syndrome (hemolysis, elevated liver enzymes, low platelets), hyperemesis gravidarum, acute fatty liver of pregnancy, and maternal floor infarct of the placenta. Additionally, it has been correlated with Acute fatty liver of pregnancy (AFLP) disease.

From a clinical perspective, HADHA might also be a useful marker to predict resistance to certain types of chemotherapy in patients with lung cancer.

Interactions 
HADHA has been shown to have 142 binary protein-protein interactions including 117 co-complex interactions. HADHA appears to interact with GABARAP, MAP1LC3B, TRAF6, GABARAPL2, GABARAPL1, GAST, BCAR3, EPB41, TNFRSF1A, HLA-B, NFKB2, MAP3K1, IKBKE, PRKAB1, RIPK3, CD74, NR4A1, cdsA, mtaD, ATXN2L, ABCF2, and MAPK3.

References

Further reading

External links 
 PDBe-KB provides an overview of all the structure information available in the PDB for Human Trifunctional enzyme subunit alpha, mitochondrial (HADHA)

EC 1.1.1